Notable Chabad websites include those sites used for educational, religious and communal purposes run by or otherwise affiliated with the Chabad-Lubavitch, Hasidic movement. Scholars have noted that more than any other Jewish movement Chabad has used media as part of its religious, social, and political experience, and that Chabad is one of the few Hasidic groups to utilize the internet and not shun it.

Chabad-Lubavitch websites

Official Website
Lubavitch.com

Outreach and educational websites
Chabad.org
Chabad.fm
Chabad.network

Community websites
The Chabad community maintains community news websites: 
 Anash.org
 Shmais.com
 COLlive.com

Collections
A number of Chabad websites contain collections of Chabad literature including complete Hasidic texts, memoirs, journals, hagiography. The collections have been noted for their value to researchers studying the movement.

See also
 Chabad

References

Chabad-Lubavitch (Hasidic dynasty)